James Nicolas Luchey (born James Nicolas Williams March 30, 1977) is a former American football fullback in the National Football League (NFL). Luchey was drafted in the fifth round of the 1999 NFL Draft (135th overall) by the Cincinnati Bengals out of the University of Miami.  He played high school football at Harrison High School in Farmington Hills, Michigan, where he won two state football championships (1993 and 1994) before graduating in 1995. He entered the NFL using the name Nick Williams but changed his surname to Luchey in August 2002 to honor his father and grandfather.

Career
 Cincinnati Bengals (1999–2002, 2005)
 Green Bay Packers (2003–2004)
 Baltimore Ravens (2006)

External links
 Nick Luchey - NFL Career Statistics from NFL.com 
 Nick Luchey on NFLPlayers.com - Invalid Link (February 25, 2009).

1977 births
Living people
Sportspeople from Royal Oak, Michigan
Players of American football from Michigan
American football fullbacks
Miami Hurricanes football players
Cincinnati Bengals players
Green Bay Packers players
Baltimore Ravens players